Piero Tosi (10 April 1927 – 10 August 2019) was an Italian costume designer.

Biography
Tosi's film credits include Senso, Bellissima, The Leopard, Yesterday, Today and Tomorrow, Death in Venice, The Night Porter, and La Traviata.

He was particularly known for his exhaustively researched and intricately detailed historical costumes.

He won the David di Donatello for Best Costumes twice, as well as the 50th Anniversary David in 2006. He also won the BAFTA Award for Best Costume Design twice, and was nominated for the Academy Award for Best Costume Design five times.

For his personal achievements in costume design over 75 years, he was awarded an Academy Honorary Award on 16 November 2013.

He died in Rome on 10 August 2019, at the age of 92.

Partial filmography

References

External links

  An Italian documentary directed by Francesco Costabile

1927 births
2019 deaths
People from Sesto Fiorentino
Italian costume designers
David di Donatello Career Award winners
Nastro d'Argento winners
Academy Honorary Award recipients
Best Costume Design BAFTA Award winners